Amir Junaid Muhadith (born Chauncey Lamont Hawkins, on June 20, 1975), best known by his stage name Loon, is a retired American rapper best known for his association with Sean Combs's Bad Boy Records. He was featured artist on Combs's 2002 hits "I Need a Girl (Part One)" and "I Need a Girl (Part Two)".

Career
Chauncey Lamont Hawkins was born in Harlem, New York. He started his music career as a member of Mase's rap collective Harlem World and then became part of P. Diddy's Bad Boy Records under the name Loon. He released his self-titled debut album Loon in 2003 and made many guest appearances on songs of the R&B and hip hop genres. Loon left Bad Boy Records in 2004 to start his own record label, Boss Up Entertainment.

Conversion to Islam
Loon converted to Islam in December 2008 after a trip to Abu Dhabi, and Dubai, UAE. Born Chauncey Lamont Hawkins, he officially changed his name to Amir Junaid Muhadith after traveling to Mecca, Saudi Arabia, the holiest site of Islam, to perform Umrah. After having converted to Islam, he subsequently ended his music career and would later relocate to Cairo, Egypt where he lived until 2011, and then lastly moved back to the United States of America from 2011 to 2022, and stayed in the United States of America in 2022.

Legal issues
On November 22, 2011, Muhadith was arrested while on a trip to Brussels. He was extradited to the United States in May 2012 and was sentenced to 14 years' imprisonment in July 2013 for conspiracy with intent to traffic one or more kilograms of heroin. Many reports have advocated for and confirmed his innocence.

Amid the COVID-19 pandemic effects in prison centers, Muhadith was granted early release on July 29, 2020.

Discography

Studio albums

Singles

As lead artist

As featured artist

Guest appearances 
1998: "Back Up Off The Wall" Brand Nubian (uncredited)
2002: "How U Want Dat" (Remix) by the Game
2003: "Tru Rider" (Mowett feat. Loon)
2003: "Gangsta Sh*t" (Snoop Dogg feat. Loon
2005: "Smile for Me" (Massari feat. Loon)
2009: "What You Say" (Loon feat. Christopher)
2009: "No Way Nobody" (Karl Wolf feat. Loon)

Filmography

Films

References

External links
Official Loon Myspace

1975 births
African-American male rappers
African-American Muslims
American prisoners and detainees
Bad Boy Records artists
Converts to Islam
Converts to Sunni Islam
Living people
People from Harlem
Rappers from Manhattan
American Salafis
21st-century American rappers
21st-century American male musicians
21st-century African-American musicians
20th-century African-American people